The Mutterbach is a river of Saarland, Germany. It flows into the Blies in Limbach.

See also
List of rivers of Saarland

Rivers of Saarland
Rivers of Germany